Rana is a municipality in Nordland county, Norway. It is part of the Helgeland traditional region. The administrative centre of the municipality is the town of Mo i Rana, which houses the National Library of Norway. Other population centers in Rana include Båsmoen, Dunderland, Eiteråga, Flostrand, Hauknes, Mæla, Myklebustad, Nevernes, Røssvoll, Selfors, Skonseng, Storforshei, Utskarpen, and Ytteren.

The  municipality is the 4th largest by area out of the 356 municipalities in Norway (the largest municipality outside Troms og Finnmark county). Rana is the 45th most populous municipality in Norway with a population of 26,092. This makes it the second largest municipality in Nordland county—and the third largest in North Norway.

Rana was a part of the Terra Securities scandal in 2007 relating to some investments that were made by the municipality.

General information

Municipal history
The municipality of Rana was originally established on 1 January 1838 (see formannskapsdistrikt law). However, it was divided into Nord-Rana and Sør-Rana in 1839. In 1844, Nord-Rana was renamed Mo and Sør-Rana was renamed Hemnes. The village of Mo was separated from the rural district of Mo and became a town and municipality of its own on 1 January 1923. At that time, the rural district changed its name back to Nord-Rana. During the 1960s, there were many municipal mergers across Norway due to the work of the Schei Committee. On 1 January 1964, the town of Mo (population: 9,616), the municipality of Nord-Rana (population: 11,636), the northern part of the municipality of Sør-Rana (population: 697), and the Sjona area of the municipality of Nesna (population: 543) were all merged. The united municipality was named simply Rana.

Name
The municipality is named after the river Ranelva. The name of the river is probably derived from the word  which means "quick", "fast", or "rapid". Another possibility is that the name comes from the old Sami god Rana Niejta.

Coat of arms
The coat of arms was granted on 5 March 1965. The official blazon is "Per bend sinister vert and Or". This means the arms have a field (background) that is divided by a diagonal line from the lower left to the upper right. The field that is below the line has a tincture of Or which means it is commonly colored yellow, but if it is made out of metal, then gold is used. The field that is above the line has a tincture of green. The arms symbolize the forests (upper part/green) and the minerals (lower part/gold), as there many minerals can be found in the area, especially iron ore. The arms were originally granted to the municipality of Mo on 29 April 1960 until that municipality was dissolved in 1 January 1964 when it became part of the new municipality of Rana. The arms were designed by Gunnar Alm.

Churches
The Church of Norway has six parishes within the municipality of Rana. It is part of the Indre Helgeland prosti (deanery) in the Diocese of Sør-Hålogaland.

Geography

The municipality is located just south of the Arctic circle, on the southern side of the Saltfjellet mountains with the Svartisen glacier, Norway's second largest glacier. Some of the large mountains in Rana include Bolna and Nasa. Mo is so close to the Arctic Circle that parts of the sun is continuously over the horizon (Midnight sun) from early June to early July, and there is no darkness from mid-May to the beginning of August. But there is no true polar night in December.  The Saltfjellet–Svartisen National Park is partly located in Rana. There are many valleys such as the Dunderland Valley and Grønnfjelldal.

The majority of the population in the municipality lives in Mo i Rana, where the Ranelva (river) meets the Ranfjorden. North of Mo i Rana, the European route E6 highway passes through the suburb of Selfors. In western Rana, the population centers around the Sjona fjord.

Rana and Saltfjellet are famous for their numerous caves due to the limestone rock. There are several nature reserves in the municipality, such as Alterhaug with several warmer-climate plants grow including the elm.  Engasjyen, the estuary of the Rana river, has a rich bird life in the spring.  Blakkådalen has old growth spruce forests.  Fisktjørna, has a largely undisturbed mixed old growth forest with unusually rich plant life due to the extremely lime-rich soil.

Climate

Rana is situated near the innermost part of the long Ranafjord, and the winters can be cold, especially away from the fjord. There is often a lot of snow in winter. Summer days in Rana are among the warmest in North Norway.

Lakes and rivers
There are many lakes and rivers in the municipality, both in the lowlands and in the mountains.

Government
All municipalities in Norway, including Rana, are responsible for primary education (through 10th grade), outpatient health services, senior citizen services, unemployment and other social services, zoning, economic development, and municipal roads. The municipality is governed by a municipal council of elected representatives, which in turn elect a mayor.  The municipality falls under the Rana District Court and the Hålogaland Court of Appeal.

Municipal council
The municipal council of Rana is made up of 37 representatives that are elected to four year terms. The party breakdown of the council is as follows:

Mayors
The mayors of Rana:

1964-1965: Per Karstensen (Ap)
1965-1976: Alf Andreas Øverli (Ap)
1976-1985: Bjørg Simonsen (Ap)
1986-1987: Ole Ingar Lindseth (Ap)
1987-2003: Svein Bogen (Ap)
2003-2007: Inge Myrvoll (SV)
2007-2011: Geir Waage (Ap)
2011-2015: Kai Henning Henriksen (H)
2015-present: Geir Waage (Ap)

Notable people 

 Ole Tobias Olsen (1830 in the Dunderland Valley – 1924) a Norwegian teacher and minister and father of the Nordland Line between Trondheim and Bodø
 Nils Hansteen (1855 in Mo i Rana – 1912) a painter of landscapes and marine art
 Per Karstensen (1915–2010) went to school in Ytteren, an educator and politician, Mayor of Nord-Rana & Rana 1963-1965
 Sverre Bratland (1917 in Utskarpen – 2002) a Norwegian military leader
 Egil Øyjord (born 1928 in Mo i Rana) an academic and founder of the International Association on Mechanization of Field Experiments (IAMFE)
 Bjørn Alterhaug (born 1945 in Mo i Rana)  a jazz bassist, composer and professor of music
 Inge Myrvoll (born 1948 in Rana) a politician, Mayor of Rana & deputy since 2003
 Laila Stien (born 1946) a novelist, poet and author of children's literature, grew up in Rana
 Guttorm Guttormsen (born 1950 in Mo i Rana) a jazz musician, arranger and composer
 Anne Grete Hollup (born 1957 in Mo i Rana) a novelist, playwright and children's writer
 Geir Bjørklund (born 1969 in Mo i Rana) researcher and medical science writer and editor
 Hans Olav Lahlum (born 1973 in Mo i Rana) historian, crime author, chess player and politician

Sport 

 Tom Sandberg (born 1955 in Mo i Rana) a former Nordic combined skier, gold medallist at the 1984 Winter Olympics 
 Trond Sollied (born 1959 in Mo i Rana) a football manager and former player with 262 club caps and 15 for Norway
 Elin Nilsen (born 1968 in Mo i Rana) a Norwegian former cross-country skier, three time team silver medallist at the 1992, 1994 and 1998 Winter Olympics
 Kenneth Braaten (born 1974) a Nordic combined skier, team gold medallist at the 1998 Winter Olympics
 Jan Egil Andresen (born 1978 in Mo i Rana) a cross-country skier, competed at the 2006 Winter Olympics
 Marius Erlandsen (born 1979 in Mo i Rana) a Norwegian auto racing driver
 Kristin Størmer Steira (born 1981 in Mo i Rana) a retired Norwegian cross-country skier
 Karianne Bjellånes (born 1986 in Mo i Rana) a Norwegian cross-country skier
 Joar Leifseth Ulsom (born 1987 in Mo i Rana) a Norwegian dog musher
 Martin Bjørnbak (born 1992 in Mo i Rana) a footballer with over 250 club caps
 Lisa-Marie Karlseng Utland (born 1992 in Mo i Rana) a footballer with over 200 club caps and 51 for Norway
 Emilie Kalkenberg (born 1997 in Mo i Rana) Norwegian biathlete

Transportation
Rana has an airport, Mo i Rana Airport, Røssvoll in the village of Røssvoll, not far from the town of Mo i Rana. There are several large highways in Rana: European route E6, Norwegian County Road 17, and Norwegian County Road 12. The Illhollia Tunnel is part of the E6 highway. The Nordland Line passes through Rana, with several stations including Mo i Rana Station, Dunderland Station, and Bolna Station.

Media gallery

Culture
 Havmannen, sculpture made by Antony Gormley (1995), part of Artscape Nordland.
 Havmanndagene, annual multi-cultural festival, first weekend of May.
 Nordland Teater, regional drama theatre for Nordland County.
 Vikafestivalen, annual pop and rock music festival.
 Nordland County library.
 National Library of Norway.

International relations

Twin towns—Sister cities
The sister cities of Rana are:
 Løgstør, Nordjylland, Denmark
 Petrozavodsk, Karelia, Russia
 Raahe, Northern Ostrobothnia, Finland
 Skellefteå, Västerbotten, Sweden

References

External links
Municipal fact sheet from Statistics Norway 

Official tourist information about the Arctic Circle area
DNT Rana 
Rana municipality 
moirana.com - Local portal for Mo i Rana 

 
Municipalities of Nordland
1838 establishments in Norway
1839 disestablishments in Norway
1964 establishments in Norway